Tai Reina Babilonia (born September 22, 1959) is an American former pair skater. Together with Randy Gardner, she won the 1979 World Figure Skating Championships and five U.S. Figure Skating Championships (1976–1980). The pair qualified for the 1976 and 1980 Winter Olympics.

Career
Babilonia and Gardner began skating together at eight and ten years old when skating coach Mabel Fairbanks needed a young pair team for a skating show in Culver City, California. Their coach from 1971 until 1980 was John Nicks. The pair became five-time U.S. national champions and won the gold medal at the 1979 World Championships. They were medal favorites at the 1980 Winter Olympics but were forced to withdraw due to an injury to Gardner.

Babilonia was the first figure skater of partial black to compete for the United States at Olympics and win world titles. She is also part Filipino on her father's side and part Native American.

In 1990, a biographical film of her rise to fame was aired on television, 
On Thin Ice: The Tai Babilonia Story.

Babilonia appeared in the 2006 Fox television program Skating with Celebrities, partnered with Olympic decathlon gold medalist Bruce Jenner.

Babilonia and Gardner also appeared on an episode of Hart to Hart "Silent Dance" (season 5 episode 16) in 1984.

Personal life

Babilonia was inspired at the age of six to begin ice skating after watching Peggy Fleming on television. Babilonia has a son named Scout with former husband Cary Butler.  She was engaged in 2005 to actor and comedian David Brenner, but they never married before their breakup in 2011.

Competitive highlights
(with Gardner)

References

External links
 
 

American female pair skaters
Olympic figure skaters of the United States
Figure skaters at the 1976 Winter Olympics
Figure skaters at the 1980 Winter Olympics
American sportspeople of Filipino descent
Sportspeople from Ashland, Oregon
1959 births
Living people
Figure skaters from Los Angeles
World Figure Skating Championships medalists
21st-century American women
20th-century American women